Spook Chasers is a 1957 horror/comedy film starring the comedy team of The Bowery Boys and Robert Shayne.  The film was released on June 2, 1957 by Allied Artists and is the forty-fifth film in the series.

Plot
Café owner Mike Clancy is told by his doctor that he needs to take a rest in the mountains due to his asthma. A crooked real estate agent sells Mike an old house that once belonged to the widow of a gangster. Mike and the Bowery Boys head out to the house, and eventually find a large pile of money hidden inside. Pretty soon, old friends of the deceased gangster who once owned the house catch wind of the Boys' discovery, and decide to rob the place. To add to this madness, the Bowery Boys find the house to be supposedly inhabited by ghosts.

Cast

The Bowery Boys
 Huntz Hall as Horace Debussy 'Sach' Jones
 Stanley Clements as Stanislaus 'Duke' Covelske
 David Gorcey as Charles 'Chuck' Anderson
 Jimmy Murphy as Myron
 Eddie LeRoy as Blinky

Remaining cast
 Percy Helton as Mike Clancy
 Darlene Fields as Dolly Owens
 Peter Mamakos as Snap Sizzolo
 Ben Welden as Ziggie
 Robert Shayne as Lt. Harris
 William Henry as Harry Shelby
 Robert Christopher as Ernie
 Pierre Watkin as Dr. Moss
 Audrey Conti as 1st Doll
 Anne Fleming as 2nd Doll
 Bill Cassady as Photographer

Production
The film marks the first appearance of Percy Helton, who plays the shopkeeper, Mike Clancy.  It also marks the first appearance of Blinky, played by Eddie LeRoy, as a member of the gang.  In addition, David Gorcey now reverts to using his real last name in the onscreen credits.

Home media
Warner Archives released the film on made-to-order DVD in the United States as part of "The Bowery Boys, Volume Three" on October 1, 2013.

Critical reception
Leonard Maltin wrote, "yet another Bowery Boys crooks-posing-as-ghosts entry, with a surfeit of wheezy gags." Unseen Films noted, "on its own terms it's actually a fun little film."

See also
 List of American films of 1957

References

External links
 
 
 
 

1957 films
1957 horror films
1950s comedy horror films
Allied Artists films
American black-and-white films
American comedy horror films
Bowery Boys films
Films directed by George Blair
1950s ghost films
1957 comedy films
1950s English-language films
1950s American films